The 2005–06 Liga Artzit season saw Hapoel Bnei Lod win the title and promotion to Liga Leumit alongside runners-up Maccabi Ahi Nazareth. Maccabi Tzur Shalom and Tzafririm Holon were relegated to Liga Alef.

Final table

References
Israel Third Level 2005/06 RSSSF

Liga Artzit seasons
3
Israel